Stefan Lexa (born 1 November 1976) is an Austrian former professional footballer who played as a right winger.

Club career
Much-travelled Lexa was born in Klagenfurt but was raised in Germany. At the age of seven years he started at SV Heimstetten. As youth player he also played for TSV 1860 Munich. He spent a couple of years in the 2. Bundesliga before winning promotion to the Bundesliga with Eintracht Frankfurt after he got relegated with them the season before. With Eintracht he also lost the 2006 DFB-Pokal final. After that final he moved back to the 2. Bundesliga to play for 1. FC Kaiserslautern before making his debut in the Austrian Football Bundesliga with SV Ried in 2008. In 2002–03, he also played 11 games for Segunda División side CD Tenerife.

The Carinthian was classified as a good dribbler and mostly played on the right wing.

International career
Lexa debuted for Austria in an October 2001 World Cup qualification match against Israel under manager Otto Barić. He was capped six times, in doing so not being capped for four years between 2002 and 2006. His last international was a May 2006 friendly match against Croatia.

Career statistics

Honours
Eintracht Frankfurt
 DFB-Pokal: runner-up 2005–06

SV Grödig
 Erste Liga: 2012–13

References

External links

 
 
 Stefan Lexa Interview

1976 births
Living people
Sportspeople from Klagenfurt
Austrian footballers
Footballers from Carinthia (state)
Association football wingers
Austria international footballers
Austrian Football Bundesliga players
Bundesliga players
2. Bundesliga players
Segunda División players
TSV 1860 Munich players
SV Heimstetten players
SV Wacker Burghausen players
SV Wehen Wiesbaden players
SpVgg Unterhaching players
SSV Reutlingen 05 players
CD Tenerife players
Eintracht Frankfurt players
1. FC Kaiserslautern players
SV Ried players
SV Grödig players
Austrian expatriate footballers
Austrian expatriate sportspeople in Germany
Expatriate footballers in Germany
Austrian expatriate sportspeople in Spain
Expatriate footballers in Spain